Mao Weiming (born May 1961) is a Chinese politician, serving since November 2020 as the Governor of the Hunan Province.

Biography 
Mao was born in Quzhou, Zhejiang. He graduated from Zhejiang University in 1982, majoring chemical engineering. In September 1985, he joined the Communist Party. He had been served as the Secretary-General of Jiangsu Province (2013), the Deputy Minister of Industry and Information Technology (2013–2015), the Executive Deputy Governor of Jiangxi Province (2015–January 2020), and Chairman of the State Grid Corporation of China (January–November 2020).

In November 2020, Mao was named the Deputy Party Secretary and acting Governor of Hunan. He was elected as the Governor in January 2021.

Mao is a delegate to the 11th, 12th and 13th National People's Congress. He is also an alternate member of the 19th Central Committee of the CPC.

References 

1961 births
Living people
Politicians from Quzhou
Chinese Communist Party politicians from Zhejiang
Governors of Hunan
Alternate members of the 19th Central Committee of the Chinese Communist Party
Delegates to the 13th National People's Congress
Delegates to the 12th National People's Congress
Delegates to the 11th National People's Congress
Zhejiang University alumni